The women's 1000 meter at the 2022 KNSB Dutch Single Distance Championships in Heerenveen took place at Thialf ice skating rink on Sunday 31 October 2021. There were 24 participants. Although the tournament was held in 2021 it was the 2022 edition as it was part of the 2021–2022 speed skating season. The first 5 skaters were eligible for the following World Cup tournaments.

Statistics

Result

Referee: Berri de Jonge. Assistant: Suzan van den Belt. Starter: Marco Hesselink 
Start: 16:21.00 hr.  Finish: 16:50.52 hr.

Source:

Draw

References

Single Distance Championships
2022 Single Distance
World